Extinction(s) is the seventh studio album by American metalcore band Unearth, released on November 23, 2018 via Century Media. This is their first album to feature bassist Chris O'Toole and the last to feature guitarist Ken Susi.

Background and recording
Initial information about the follow-up to Watchers of Rule surfaced in early 2018 when Daniel "DL" Laskiewicz, ex-guitarist of The Acacia Strain, revealed that he had been helping out with the new Unearth album by bouncing riff ideas with Unearth guitarists Buz McGrath and Ken Susi. And then in a February 2018 interview, McGrath stated that the band "got probably twenty songs written" for the new album. On March 16, 2018, the band officially signed worldwide deal with Century Media Records and revealed that recording of the new album would be started soon, scheduled for a tentative late summer or early fall 2018 release.

On March 26, 2018, the band entered Graphic Nature Studio with Will Putney to begin recording their new album. Drums were recorded by Adam Dutkiewicz, guitarist of Killswitch Engage. Bass guitar, guitar solo and vocals were tracked at the Brick HitHouse, and strings and piano were done by Randy Slaugh.

Release
On July 2, 2018, the band announced that the new album will be entitled Extinction(s), and released "Incinerate", the first single of Extinction(s). On September 18, 2018, the band revealed the release date, tracklist and artwork for Extinction(s), which would be released on November 23, 2018 through Century Media. A lyric video of the second single "Survivalist" was available for streaming on September 28, 2018. A music video of the song "One with the Sun" was released on November 15, 2018.

The band commented on Extinction(s):

The band also elaborated on the song "Incinerate":

Track listing

Personnel
Unearth
 Trevor Phipps – lead vocals
 Buz McGrath – guitar
 Ken Susi – Guitar, backing vocals
 Chris O'Toole – bass, backing vocals
 Nick Pierce – drums

Additional musician
 Randy Slaugh – string arrangements, piano 
 Sunny Phipps – additional vocals

Production
 Will Putney – production, engineering, mixing, mastering
 Adam Dutkiewicz – engineering 
 Daniel Castleman – engineering
 Shane Frisby – engineering
 Forefathers – layout
 Dan Bradley – photography

References

2018 albums
Albums produced by Will Putney
Unearth albums
Century Media Records albums